Joseph Batangdon (born July 29, 1978) is a former Cameroonian sprinter who specialized in the 200 metres.

Batangdon became African champion in 2004, a month before the 2004 Summer Olympics. Competing in the 200 metres contest, he did advance from the heats but pulled out of the competition.

Competition record

Personal bests

Outdoor

Indoor

External links
 

1978 births
Living people
Cameroonian male sprinters
Athletes (track and field) at the 2000 Summer Olympics
Athletes (track and field) at the 2004 Summer Olympics
Olympic athletes of Cameroon
Athletes (track and field) at the 2002 Commonwealth Games
Athletes (track and field) at the 2006 Commonwealth Games
Commonwealth Games competitors for Cameroon
African Games silver medalists for Cameroon
African Games medalists in athletics (track and field)
Athletes (track and field) at the 1999 All-Africa Games
Athletes (track and field) at the 2003 All-Africa Games
World Athletics Indoor Championships medalists
Islamic Solidarity Games competitors for Cameroon
Islamic Solidarity Games medalists in athletics
20th-century Cameroonian people
21st-century Cameroonian people